was a Japanese-American particle physicist and theorist.

While a graduate student at Cornell University, Sakurai independently discovered the V-A theory of weak interactions.

He authored the popular graduate text Modern Quantum Mechanics (1985, published posthumously) and other texts such as Invariance Principles and Elementary Particles (1964) and Advanced Quantum Mechanics (1967).

Life and career

J. J. Sakurai was born in Tokyo in 1933 and moved to the United States when he was a high school student. He studied Physics at Harvard and Cornell, where he proposed his theory of weak interactions. After receiving his PhD from Cornell in 1958 he joined the faculty at University of Chicago, becoming a full professor in 1964.  In 1970, Sakurai moved to the University of California, Los Angeles.

As a graduate student, he proposed the V−A theory of weak interactions, independently of Robert Marshak, George Sudarshan, Richard Feynman, and Murray Gell-Mann. In 1960,  he published a paper on the theory of strong interactions based on Abelian and non-Abelian (Yang-Mills) gauge invariance.

In that paper, he also  pioneered the vector meson dominance model of hadron dynamics.

Sakurai died from an aneurysm in 1982 during a visit to CERN.

Textbooks

In addition to his published papers, Sakurai authored several textbooks. These include Invariance Principles and Elementary Particles (1964), Advanced Quantum Mechanics (1967), and Modern Quantum Mechanics. The third volume was left unfinished due to Sakurai's sudden death in 1982, but was later edited and completed with the help of his wife, Noriko Sakurai, and colleague San Fu Tuan. Modern Quantum Mechanics is probably his most well known book and is still widely used for graduate studies today.

Sakurai Prize

In 1984 the family and friends of J. J. Sakurai endowed a prize for theoretical physicists in his honor. The goal of the prize as stated on the APS website is to encourage outstanding work in the field of particle theory. Recipients receive a $10,000 grant, an allowance for travel to the ceremony, and a certificate citing their contributions to particle physics.

See also

 Sakurai Prize

References

Further reading 

 Sakurai, J. J, and Jim Napolitano. Modern Quantum Mechanics. 2nd ed., Cambridge University Press, 2017. .
 Townsend, John S. A Modern Approach to Quantum Mechanics. 2nd ed., University Science Books, 2012. .

External links

 University of California: In Memoriam, 1985
Scientific publications of J. J. Sakurai on INSPIRE-HEP

1933 births
1982 deaths
Harvard University alumni
Cornell University alumni
University of Chicago faculty
University of California, Los Angeles faculty
20th-century American physicists
Particle physicists
American academics of Japanese descent
People from Tokyo
Japanese emigrants to the United States
People associated with CERN
The Bronx High School of Science alumni
Scientists from New York (state)